There is no current State Route 43 in the U.S. state of Alabama.

See U.S. Route 43 in Alabama for the current route numbered 43
See Alabama State Route 43 (pre-1957) for the former SR 43